Kingswood Methodist Episcopal Church, also known as Kingswood Mission of St. Paul's M.E. Church, Kingswood Community Center, and Jimmy Jenkins Community Center, was a historic Methodist Episcopal church located in Wilmington, New Castle County, Delaware in Riverside–11th Street Bridge. It was built in 1891, and was a two bay by three bay, detached brick structure in a Vernacular Romanesque style.

It was added to the National Register of Historic Places in 1989.  It has since been demolished.

References

Methodist churches in Delaware
Churches in Wilmington, Delaware
Churches on the National Register of Historic Places in Delaware
National Register of Historic Places in Wilmington, Delaware